Jonathan Lee (born 26 April 1982) is an English actor and singer. Lee was the youngest member of pop group S Club 7, which disbanded in April 2003. The group starred in a number of their own television series, beginning with Miami 7, playing themselves. Since the group split, Lee has had a career in musical theatre, taking on roles in more than 17 productions, including the West End shows Les Misérables and Jersey Boys.

Career

1994–1998: stage 
At the age of 13, Lee played the leading role in the West End production of Oliver! at the London Palladium Theatre, alongside Jonathan Pryce, and later George Layton, as Fagin. In 1997, Lee played the role of Julian in the premiere of Famous Five Smuggler's Gold the musical.
Played josh Haye in eastenders in 1998

1999–2003: S Club 7 

Lee was a member of pop group S Club 7, who rose to fame by starring in their own BBC television series, Miami 7, in 1999. Over the five years they were together, they had four UK No.1 singles, one UK No.1 album, hits throughout Europe, and a top-ten single in the United States, Asia, Latin America and Africa. They recorded four studio albums, released eleven singles and sold over fourteen million albums worldwide. In 2001 the group earned the Record of the Year award. Group member Paul Cattermole departed the group in 2002, and the group changed its name from S Club 7 to simply S Club. On 21 April 2003, during a live onstage performance, S Club announced that they were to disband.

2004–present: acting 
In 2004 Lee played the role of Marius in Les Misérables at the Palace Theatre in London, and continued the role following the show's move to the smaller Queen's Theatre. In 2005 Lee toured the UK with the new musical, Love Shack, featuring disco classics and hit dance songs from the charts, starring alongside Steps' Faye Tozer and Hear'Say's Noel Sullivan. In August 2006 Lee starred in The Heather Brothers' production of Teen Scream at the Assembly Rooms at the Edinburgh Festival Fringe. He returned to the London stage in 2010 in the musical Tomorrow Morning. Lee worked on a number of other musical projects before returning to the stage, including  BBC's "The Sound of Musicals". In 2008 he recorded a song for the CD Act One – Songs From The Musicals Of Alexander S. Bermange, an album of 20 new recordings by 26 West End stars. It was released in November 2008 on Dress Circle Records.

In 2008 Lee voiced the part of Max, in the British Disney Channel cartoon series Famous 5: On the Case. Over Christmas and New Year's 2008–09 he appeared at The White Rock Theatre, Hastings, performing the leading role in the pantomime Peter Pan. Both Lee and the show were well received. Later in 2009 Lee appeared as Billy Fury in Nick Moran's new film Telstar. On 22 May 2010 he appeared in BBC One's Casualty as Craig, who is diagnosed with motor neurone disease. He played John in the internationally acclaimed musical Tomorrow Morning by Laurence Mark Wythe at the Landor Theatre in London. Over the following Christmas and New Year's, Lee appeared at the New Victoria Theatre, Woking as Prince Charming in Cinderella.

In October 2012 Lee announced his debut solo album, Fallen Angel. The first track on the album, "My Father's Son", was premiered on 4 November by BBC Radio 2's Paul O'Grady. The album was released on 4 March 2013. Lee took on the part of Frankie Valli in Jersey Boys at the Prince Edward Theatre, London, from 15 March 2011 until 7 March  2014. At the end of 2012, whilst maintaining his Jersey Boys commitments, Lee took the lead role in Aladdin at The O2 in London and acted alongside O'Grady, who revived his alter-ego Lily Savage.

In August 2016, Lee appeared at the Lytham Festival's West End Proms. In March 2017 Lee appeared on Let's Sing and Dance for Comic Relief as part of Boys Allowed with Gareth Gates. Duncan James, Ritchie Neville and Ben Ofoedu. In March 2018, he appeared on ITV's Dinner Date.

Personal life 
In August 2010 Lee revealed, in an interview with Gay Times magazine, that he was gay. He added that he had come out to family and friends at a young age, and that "it's never needed to be a huge change that I've had to tell everyone about".

Stage

Filmography

Discography

Studio albums

Singles

References

External links 

Jon Lee on Myspace
Jon Lee on YouTube
 – at the Lytham Festival, 2016

1982 births
20th-century LGBT people
21st-century LGBT people
Alumni of the Sylvia Young Theatre School
English gay actors
English gay musicians
English male singers
English male soap opera actors
English pop singers
English LGBT musicians
British LGBT singers
Living people
Male actors from Devon
Musicians from Devon
S Club 7 members